Suchdol is a municipal district (městská část) in Prague, Czech Republic.

History

References

Districts of Prague